The National Council for Private School Accreditation (NCPSA) is a private organization dedicated to accrediting American private schools on a national level. It was created in 1993 to form at-large standards after the U.S. Department of Education in 1985 deemed the Department did not have legal authority to recognize any elementary and secondary accrediting agency. It currently fully accredits 17 accrediting agencies including the Florida Association of Christian Colleges and Schools.

References

School accreditors